Jens Ingo Holger Franz Kujawa (Jan. 28, 1965) is a former professional basketball player born in Braunschweig, Lower Saxony, West Germany. In 1984, he was a foreign exchange student and a prep basketball player at Taylorville High School in Taylorville, Illinois.  He went on to play basketball at for the University of Illinois Fighting Illini team from 1984–1988, where he earned three letters. Kujawa left for his native Germany before his senior season after averaging 5.3 points and 5.2 rebounds per game in his junior season for the Illini.

He represented Germany in the 1992 Summer Olympics held in Barcelona, Spain. The German team finished seventh overall, with a record of three wins and five losses. He was a member of the German national team that won the only European title for the country in 1993.

Professionally, Kujawa played for German teams in Leverkusen, Ludwigsburg, Ulm and Oberelchingen from 1988–2001.

He lives in Winsen (Luhe), Germany and works as a consultant in the field of lifetime working accounts.

He is a member of the board for the German association for lifetime working accounts AG ZWK and a charity organisation BASKETBALL AID.

References

Living people
1965 births
Basketball players at the 1992 Summer Olympics
FIBA EuroBasket-winning players
German men's basketball players
Illinois Fighting Illini men's basketball players
Ratiopharm Ulm players
Sportspeople from Braunschweig
Olympic basketball players of Germany